The 1980 Women's Pretty Polly British Open Squash Championships was held at the Coral Squash Club in Hove from 23–28 February 1980. The event was won by Vicki Hoffman who defeated Sue Cogswell in the final.

Seeds

Draw and results

References

Women's British Open Squash Championships
Squash in England
Women's British Open Squash Championship
Sport in Brighton and Hove
Women's British Open Squash Championship
British Open Squash Championship
Women's British Open Squash Championship